The 2023 Boston College Eagles football team will represent Boston College as a member of the Atlantic Coast Conference (ACC) during the 2023 NCAA Division I FBS football season. They will be led by fourth-year head coach Jeff Hafley, the Eagles will play their home games at Alumni Stadium in Chestnut Hill, Massachusetts.

Offseason

Recruits

2023 recruiting class
Boston College signed 18 players in the class of 2023. 

  

  
  
  
  
  
 
 
 
 

 
 

|}

Transfer portal

Outgoing transfers
Boston College lost 7 players to the NCAA transfer portal.

Incoming transfers
Boston College received nine players from the college football transfer portal.

Schedule
Boston College and the ACC announced the 2023 football schedule on January 30, 2023. The 2023 season will be the conference's first season since 2004 that its scheduling format just includes one division. The new format sets Boston College with three set conference opponents, while playing the remaining ten teams twice in an (home and away) in a four–year cycle. The Eagles three set conference opponents for the next four years is; Miami (FL), Pittsburgh, and Syracuse.

References

Boston College
Boston College Eagles football seasons
Boston College Eagles football
Boston College Eagles football